Lukas Perathoner (born 25 April 1968) is an Italian former alpine skier.

Although he is also from South Tyrol, he is not a relative of the other Italian skier Werner Perathoner.

World Cup results
Top 15

References

External links
 

1968 births
Living people
Italian male alpine skiers
Sportspeople from Bruneck